Ralph Matthew Palmer, 12th Baron Lucas and 8th Lord Dingwall (born 7 June 1951), addressed formally as Lord Lucas and Dingwall, is one of the hereditary peers elected to remain in the House of Lords after the passing of the House of Lords Act 1999, sitting as a Conservative. He inherited his titles on the death of his mother in 1991, served as a Tory whip in the Lords 1994-97 for the last three years of the John Major government, and continues to serve as a backbencher. Known generally and professionally as Ralph Lucas, in 2000 he became owner and publisher of The Good Schools Guide.

Origins
Lady Florence Amabel Cowper, daughter of George Cowper, 6th Earl Cowper married Auberon Herbert and inherited the Barony of Lucas of Crudwell (from her grandfather, Thomas de Grey, 2nd Earl de Grey), and the Lordship of Dingwall (from her uncle Francis Cowper, 7th Earl Cowper). They were the parents of four children, including Nan Ino Cooper, 10th Baroness Lucas (Ralph Lucas's maternal grandmother), and her elder daughter, Anne Rosemary, married Major The Hon Robert Jocelyn Palmer MC (son of Roundell Palmer, 3rd Earl of Selborne).

Early life
Lucas is the son of the Anne Palmer, 11th Baroness Lucas and 7th Lady Dingwall and Major Hon Robert Jocelyn Palmer (fifth child and third son of the 3rd Earl of Selborne).  He attended Twyford School and Eton College.

During his gap year in 1969, he accompanied Professor Thomas Frederick Hewer and Brigadier Brian Mortimer Archibald across Afghanistan and Iran, collecting plants for Kew Gardens and the Royal Horticultural Society as a private expedition. He returned to study physics at Balliol College, Oxford.

Work
He took articles as a chartered accountant with Farrow, Bersey, Gain, Vincent & Co and successor firms, and worked at S. G. Warburg & Co. Ltd. from 1976 to 1988.

On the death of his mother in 1991, he succeeded her as 12th Baron Lucas and 8th Lord Dingwall.  He is the current owner of The Good Schools Guide.

He was a Lord in Waiting (Government Whip in the House of Lords) during 1994–97, and the shadow Lords minister for International Development during 1997–98. He remains an active backbencher, taking a particular interest in education, liberty, electronic government, planning, finance and parking regulation.

In 1995, Ralph Lucas married Amanda Atha, the co-founder with Sarah Drummond of The Good Schools Guide, became owner, publisher and editor of the guide in 2000; he added international schools overseas to the guide in 2006.

As editor of The Good Schools Guide, Ralph Lucas has highlighted the continued improvement of state and Special Education Needs schools: the first edition of The Good Schools Guide in 1986 listed just ten state schools – 4 per cent of the total; by the 2016 edition, more than 300 state schools were reviewed, a quarter of the 1,200 schools reviewed that year. In the 2019 edition, nearly 400 of the 1,297 schools selected for review were state schools and 140 were SEN schools.

Ralph Lucas has commented on state schools as strong competitors for the most talented students, saying, 'Many prep schools are facing a "slow and gentle good night" as a result of rapidly improving state primaries and private tutors'. He has expressed his concerns over the dangers of charlatan tutors for very young children  and rung warning bells over the ever rising fees of independent schools.

Asked by a journalist why historians make the best school leaders, he replied, 'The subject combines a fascination with humanity (pretty essential to running a school well), a disciplined way with words and stories, and a deep study of how to succeed as a dictator.'

Since inheriting his title and remaining through election by his peers, Ralph Lucas continues to be active in the House of Lords. He has served on committees that addressed digital skills, the regeneration of seaside towns, and digital technology & democracy. He chairs the Enforcement Law Reform Group. He was instrumental in adding what became known as the Lucas amendment, 'An apology, an offer of treatment or other redress, shall not of itself amount to an admission of negligence or breach of statutory duty' to the Compensation Act of 2006, allowing people to apologise to victims without legal penalty.

He met his third wife, Antonia Rubenstein, when serving as a patron on the prison reform charity, Safe Ground, and was instrumental in establishing the Family Man and Fathers Inside family relationships project.

Ralph Lucas has been involved in encouraging a relationship between The Eden Project and Eastbourne.  With Lady Lucas, he set up the Making Natural History project, using creative works to highlight environmental issues in and beyond Eastbourne.

He became a Fellow of the Institute of Chartered Accountants in England and Wales (FCA) in 1986 and is a Liveryman of the Worshipful Company of Mercers.

He was a competitor on University Challenge  for the 2004 "Professionals" series, when he competed on the House of Lords team.

Marriages and children

Lucas has been married three times. Firstly, he wed Clarissa Marie Lockett on 22 July 1978. They were divorced in 1995 after having two children.

Secondly, Lucas married Amanda Atha in 1995. She died in 2000 and in 2001, he married Antonia Kennedy Rubinstein. He has one daughter with his third wife.

References

External links
Lord Lucas Open Rights Group
Lord Lucas at Blogspot

1951 births
Living people
People educated at Eton College
Alumni of Balliol College, Oxford
Conservative Party (UK) Baronesses- and Lords-in-Waiting
Dingwall, Ralph Palmer, 8th Lord
British accountants
British editors
British educational theorists
Barons Lucas
Hereditary peers elected under the House of Lords Act 1999